Adampur Assembly constituency is a Punjab Legislative Assembly constituency in Jalandhar district, Punjab state, India.

Members of the Legislative Assembly

Election results

2022

2017

Previous years

References

External links
  

Assembly constituencies of Punjab, India
Jalandhar district